Coiltown is an unincorporated community located in Hopkins County, Kentucky, United States. The community likely took its name from W.D. Coil, who managed a local coal mine. The community is home to a rail junction, station, and coal mines.

In 2011 the community was the site of a suspected murder. Two residents of the community were arrested in connection with it in February 2012.

References

Unincorporated communities in Hopkins County, Kentucky
Unincorporated communities in Kentucky